Paulo Roberto Morais Júnior (25 February 1984 – 2018), commonly known as Paulo, was a Brazilian footballer who played for Hidd SCC in the Bahraini Premier League.

He previous played for Baraunas in his native Brazil as well as Fujairah SC in the UAE and K-League side Incheon United and Al-Nahda Club.

References

External links
Paulo Júnior Personal Website
Player Info at Goalzz.com

1984 births
2018 deaths
Association football forwards
Brazilian footballers
Brazilian expatriate footballers
ABC Futebol Clube players
Friburguense Atlético Clube players
CO Saint-Dizier players
Incheon United FC players
Al-Nahda Club (Oman) players
K League 1 players
Expatriate footballers in France
Brazilian expatriate sportspeople in France
Expatriate footballers in South Korea
Brazilian expatriate sportspeople in South Korea
Expatriate footballers in the United Arab Emirates
Brazilian expatriate sportspeople in the United Arab Emirates
Expatriate footballers in Oman
Brazilian expatriate sportspeople in Oman
Expatriate footballers in Bahrain
Brazilian expatriate sportspeople in Bahrain
People from Natal, Rio Grande do Norte
Sportspeople from Rio Grande do Norte